"No Motherland Without You" (or "Ode to Kim Jong Il"), is a North Korean song about the country's second supreme leader, Kim Jong Il.

Significance
"No Motherland Without You" was composed especially for Kim Jong Il and is considered his "signature song". The song enjoys popularity in North Korea, where it is frequently broadcast on the radio and from loudspeakers on the streets of Pyongyang. Whereas the "Song of General Kim Il-sung" was sung at the beginning of public gatherings, "No Motherland Without You" was often at the end. Since at least 1994 before the creation of the "Song of General Kim Jong-il" the song was played by the North Korean state television at the start of broadcasts each day.

Lyrics

In military contexts the title "General" replaces "comrade," reflecting that Kim was Supreme Commander of the armed forces and Chairman of the National Defence Commission in addition to his political role as General Secretary of the Workers' Party.

See also

 North Korean music
 Propaganda in North Korea
 Pochonbo Electronic Ensemble

References

External links

North Korean propaganda songs
Propaganda songs
Propaganda in North Korea
Patriotic songs
Songs about Kim Jong-il
Songs about North Korea
North Korean military marches